Ben, Benjamin or Benny Johnson may refer to:

In sports

Association football
Ben Johnson (footballer, born 2000), English footballer
Ben Johnson (soccer) (born 1977), American soccer player

Other codes of football
Ben Johnson (Australian footballer) (born 1981), Australian rules footballer
Ben Johnson (offensive tackle) (born 1980), former American football offensive tackle of the National Football League
Ben Johnson (tight end) (born 1994), American football tight end
Ben Johnson (American football coach) (born 1986), American football coach
Benny Johnson (American football) (1948–1988), American football defensive back
Benjamin Johnson (rugby league), rugby league footballer of the 1910s

Baseball
Ben Johnson (outfielder) (born 1981), American
Ben Johnson (pitcher) (1931–2020), American

Sprinting
Ben Johnson (Canadian sprinter) (born 1961), Canadian sprinter
Ben Johnson (American sprinter) (1914–1992), American sprinter

Other sports
Ben Johnson (basketball) (born 1980), American basketball coach
Ben Johnson (cricketer) (born 1973), Australian cricketer 
Ben Johnson (ice hockey) (born 1994), American professional ice hockey player
Benjamin Johnson (cyclist) (born 1983), Australian cyclist

In the arts
Ben Jonson (1572–1637), English poet and dramatist
Ben Johnson (actor) (1918–1996), American actor
Ben Johnson (artist) (born 1946), British painter
Ben Johnson (musician) (born 1984),  American musician, member of the band 100 Monkeys
Ben Patrick Johnson (born 1969), American voice-over actor, author, and commentator/activist
Benjamin Johnson (actor) (1665–1742), English actor

In government
Ben F. Johnson (1914–2006), American politician in Georgia and academic administrator
Ben Johnson (chairman) (1939–2014), American Makah politician
Ben Johnson (politician) (1858–1950), American lawyer
Benjamin Johnson (judge) (1784–1849), United States federal judge

Other people
Ben Campbell Johnson (1932–2016), American minister and professor
Benjamin F. Johnson (1818–1905), American Mormon pioneer
Benjamin Newhall Johnson (1856–1923), American attorney and historian
Benny Johnson (columnist) (born 1987), American political columnist and reporter

Film
Ben Johnson (film), a 2005 Malayalam-language film

See also
Ben Johnson House (disambiguation)
Ben Johnston (disambiguation)